Wręczyca Wielka  is a village in Kłobuck County, Silesian Voivodeship, in southern Poland. It is the seat of the gmina (administrative district) called Gmina Wręczyca Wielka.

Wręczyca Wielka has a population of 2,718.

References 

Villages in Kłobuck County